is a type of Japanese green tea. It is harvested from the second flush of sencha between summer and autumn. (The first flush is harvested for shincha.)

It can be found in a number of forms such as roasted, unroasted, smoked, matured or fermented for three years and even post-fermented. For example, goishicha.

Background
Bancha is harvested from the same tea tree as sencha grade, but it is plucked later than sencha is, giving it a lower market grade. It is considered to be one of the lowest grades of Japanese green teas. There are 22 grades of bancha. Its flavour is unique and varies depending on the type. 

Flavours range from smoke, roasted nuts, green grass, earth, soil, wet leaves, some of the types of bancha have a stronger straw smell.

See also
 Hōjicha – often made from bancha
 Japanese tea

References 

Japanese tea
Green tea